Tarrant Launceston is a small village and civil parish in north Dorset, England, situated in the Tarrant Valley  northeast of Blandford Forum. The parish includes part of Blandford Camp to the west and a few buildings on the northern edge of neighbouring Tarrant Monkton to the south. In the 2011 census the parish had 156 households and a population of 498.

Although the Great Dorset Steam Fair is advertised as being located in Tarrant Hinton, the actual show site itself is in Tarrant Launceston, which is one of the adjacent parishes.

Governance & religion
Tarrant Launceston civil parish falls under the Dorset Council ward of Cranborne Chase, whose present councillor is Conservative Piers Brown, and the parliamentary constituency of North Dorset, whose present MP is Conservative Simon Hoare.

In the Church of England, the ecclesiastical parish of Tarrant Monkton with Tarrant Launceston falls under the Chase Benefice (formed in 2001), the deanery of Milton and Blandford, the archdeaconry of Dorset, the diocese of Salisbury, and the province of Canterbury.

References

External links

Villages in Dorset